The Louis Bellson Explosion is an album by drummer Louis Bellson recorded in 1975 and released by the Pablo label.

Reception

AllMusic reviewer Ron Wynn stated "A fine mid-'70s date that was both a showcase for Bellson's bombastic drumming and also a nice straight-ahead date".

Track listing
 "The Intimacy of the Blues" (Billy Strayhorn) – 6:02
 "Quiet Riots" (Jack Hayes, Bill Holman, Louie Bellson) – 5:30
 "Carnaby Street" (Bellson, Hayes) – 6:45
 "Beyond Category" (Hayes, Bellson) – 8:19
 "Chameleon" (Herbie Hancock) – 4:33
 "Open Your Window" (Harry Nilsson) – 5:17
 "Movin' On" (John Bambridge) – 3:29
 "Groove Blues" (Don Menza) – 7:11
 "La Banda Grande" (Hayes, Bellson) – 5:25

Personnel 
Louis Bellson – drums
Cat Anderson, Dick Cooper, Blue Mitchell, Dick Mitchell, Bobby Shew, Snooky Young – trumpet
Nick DiMaio, Gil Falco, Ernie Tack, Mayo Tiana – trombone
Bill Byrne, Pete Christlieb, Larry Covelli, Don Menza, Dick Spencer – saxophones
Nat Pierce, Ross Tompkins – keyboards
Mitch Holder – guitar
John Williams – bass
Dave Levine, Paulo Magalhaes – percussion

References 

1975 albums
Louie Bellson albums
Pablo Records albums
Albums produced by Norman Granz